Bed Rest is a 2022 American horror thriller film written and directed by Lori Evans Taylor.

The film was released on Tubi on December 7, 2022. It is the first film under The Najafi Companies leadership acquisition after STX Entertainment separated from ErosSTX.

Plot
Pregnant Julie Rivers moves into a new home with her husband. During her mandatory bed rest, terrifying ghostly experiences started in the house as Julie suffers through monotony and anxiety for her constraints, which leads to Julie protecting herself and her unborn baby.

Cast
 Melissa Barrera as Julie Rivers
 Guy Burnet as Daniel Rivers
 Kristen Harris as Julie's OB-GYN
 Erik Athavale as Dr. Meadows
 Edie Inksetter as Delmy Walker
 Kristen Sawatzky as Melandra Kinsey
 Paul Essiembre as Dean Whittier

Production

Development
On July 27, 2015, Metro-Goldwyn-Mayer acquired Lori Evans Taylor’s thriller “Bed Rest” with Karen Rosenfelt and Chris Sparlding were attached to produce the film. On October 25, 2021, STX Entertainment and Project X Entertainment was set to produce “Bed Rest” with Evans Taylor set to make her directorial debut and executive produce the film with and Project X’s James Vanderbilt, William Sherak, Paul Neinstein and Melissa Barrera.

Casting
Along with the announcement, Melissa Barrera was set to star in the film. On December 10, 2021, Guy Burnet was cast in the film.

Release
Bed Rest was released on Tubi on December 7, 2022. It was previously scheduled to be released theatrically on July 15, 2022.

References

External links
 

American horror thriller films
American supernatural horror films
STX Entertainment films